Henry Whittemore Grout (March 24, 1858 – June 28, 1932) was a financier, state legislator, and philanthropist from Waterloo, Iowa.  The Grout Museum is one of his legacies.

Biography 
Henry W. Grout was born in Waterloo on March 24, 1858. He worked as a miner, farmer, traveling salesman, real estate agent, park commissioner, and bank director.

He married Olive Wright Wilson on December 29, 1892. After her death on August 30, 1910, he remarried to Agnes A. Perry on September 3, 1914.

A Republican, he was elected to two terms in the Iowa House of Representatives, serving from 1910 to 1914. He represented the 38th District in the state Senate from 1914 to 1918.

He died in Waterloo on June 28, 1932, suffering a heart attack while giving a talk at the Hotel President.

References

External links 
 The History of Waterloo - Hon. Henry W. Grout

1858 births
1932 deaths
19th-century American businesspeople
Politicians from Waterloo, Iowa
Republican Party members of the Iowa House of Representatives
Republican Party Iowa state senators